Pakorn Nemitrmansuk (born 1975) is one of Thailand's top Scrabble players and the 2009 World Scrabble Champion. An architect and resident of Bangkok, Thailand, Nemitrmansuk has competed at World Scrabble Championship six times between 1999–2011 and was the runner-up in 2003 and 2005.

At World Scrabble Championship 2009 in Malaysia in November, 2009, Nemitrmansuk won 18 games in the first 24 rounds, earning him a spot in the best-of-five final against the reigning champion Nigel Richards, where Nemitrmansuk won the championship by three games to one.

Achievements

World Scrabble Championships
1999 40th place
2001 16th place
2003 runner-up
2005 runner-up
2009 winner
2011 3rd place
Four time winner of the Brand's Crossword Game King's Cup

References

External links

1975 births
Living people
Pakorn Nemitrmansuk
World Scrabble Championship winners